Rosse Bay is an Arctic waterway in Qikiqtaaluk Region, Nunavut, Canada. It is located in Nares Strait between Pim Island and Ellesmere Island's Johan Peninsula. The bay is also connected to Rice Strait.

Geography
Physical characteristics include a gravel and sand moraine ridge on its southwestern shore. There are also tidewater glaciers. The main discharge of Lefferts Glacier is into Rosse Bay.

References

Bays of Qikiqtaaluk Region